"Invincible" is a song recorded by Canadian pop rock group Hedley for their fourth studio album, Storms (2011). Written by Hedley frontman Jacob Hoggard and Jason Van Poederooyen, and co-written and produced by Brian Howes, "Invincible" features guest vocals by Canadian hip hop artist P. Reign on the single version. The song was released to radio on August 22, 2011 and to digital retailers on August 23, 2011 through Universal Music Canada as the lead single from Storms. It was well received by critics and fans, peaking in the Top 10 of the Canadian Hot 100 and being nominated for Single of the Year at the Juno Awards of 2012.

Content and reception
"Invincible" is a pop rock song with a duration of three minutes and forty-three seconds and an anthemic message of staying strong – or "invincible" – and rising above life's challenges. Francois Marchand of The Vancouver Sun described the song as "a positive-minded, empowerment-driven kind of song" that is indicative of the more mature themes explored on this album. In the first week of the release, it sold over 14,000 copies.

Music video
Directed by Kyle Davison, the music video for "Invincible" premiered on September 6, 2011. To convey the song's message of overcoming adversity in one's life, Davison explained to Dose.ca that it was important to him to "include some people in this [video] and cast it so that the people involved have an emotional stake." It depicts a handful of characters dealing with depression and insecurities, who find peace of mind and smile towards the end of the video; footage of the band performing in a field in the rain and, after the refrain, in sunlight is cut in with these stories. The video for "Invincible" was nominated for five awards at the 2012 MMVAs, including Video of the Year, however it ultimately lost three of the awards to Carly Rae Jepsen's "Call Me Maybe", Cinematographer of the Year to Marianas Trench's "Fallout", and Pop Video of the Year to Marianas Trench's "Haven't Had Enough".

Awards and nominations

Track listing

Charts and certifications

Weekly charts

Year-end charts

Certifications

References

2011 singles
2011 songs
Hedley (band) songs
Universal Music Group singles
Songs written by Jacob Hoggard
Songs written by Brian Howes